Dance in Peru is an art form primarily of native origin. There are also dances that are related to agricultural work, hunting and war. In Peru  dancing bears an important cultural significance.  Some choreographies show certain Christian influence.

Types of dances
 The most internationally known dance in Peru is the Marinera Norteña. This dance represents a man's courting of a young woman. There are local variants of this dance in the Lima Region and the other regions of the country.
 Ancash is a dance performed in Piscobamba (Ancash Region), on the occasion of the feast of the Virgin of Mercy, on the 25th, 26th and 27 September.
 Apu Inka is a dance which re-enacts the capture of the Inca by the Spanish invaders.
 Ch'unchu is a dance performed at festivals of the Cusco Region.
 Danzantes de Levanto, a typical dance from the Amazonas Region.
 El Vals Criollo (Vals peruano) is a subgenre and musical adaptation of the original European waltz, originated in Peru or also called a genre of Afro-Peruvian Creole music.
 Huaconada (Wanka) is a ritual dance that is represented in the town of Mito, Concepción Province, Junín Region, located in the Central Andes of Peru.
 Qhapaq Qulla is a dance performed at festivals of the Cusco Region.
 Supaypa wasin tusuq (Quechua for "dancer of the devil's house") or Danza de tijeras (Spanish for "dance of scissors") is an indigenous dance native to the region of Ayacucho, no relation to the highlands, whose musical framework provided by violin and harp, and was subsequently diffused in the Huancavelica and Apurímac Regions.
 Tarkada is a dance performed during the carnival festival in the Tacna Region in Peru.
 Tondero also known as Marinera of Alto Piura, Piura yunga or (Morropón). It predates the zamacueca, and very gypsy influence in its beat, singing tragic and repetitive guitar tundete, or black African influence in its choir (choir) and rhythmic (the use of Czech, instrument made of dried gourd) and Andean in its shrill or whiny.
 Wari, a traditional dance of the Ancash Region.
 Waylas (Huaylarsh) is a dance from the central andean part of Peru in the Mantaro Valley located in the department of Junin. Is a dance very lively and cheerful, characterized by the energy and jumping of the dancers. It is a couples dance group whose origin is of harvesting potatoes.
 Wititi is a native Peruvian folk dance Tapay district, Province of Caylloma, Arequipa region in southern Peru. This dance has now spread and danced in the festivities of many villages the Colca Canyon. Witi Witi in Quechua means "making love"
 Zamacueca is an ancient colonial dance and music that originated in the Viceroyalty of Peru, taking its roots from African, Spanish, and Andean rhythms.

Amazonas Region

La Chumaichada

La Chumaichada is "the dance of Chachapoyas" because it was born in this area and it was widely practised until becoming institutionalized. No holiday or celebration is complete if it is not danced.

The music has probably an Indian origin, but the choreography has a French origin stemming from "Los Lanceros" (The lancers) - dance inserted in Chachapoyas by the bishop of the diocese at that time, monsignor Emilio Lissón, of French origin. It has been said that he had so much influence that the city became Frenchified during his time.

Los Danzantes de Levanto

Levanto is a little town that is approximately 10 km away from Chachapoyas, whose "dancers" form a very well trained showy group of thirteen cholos, that are guided by a "pifador" (a person who whistles) that plays the antara and a small drum called the tinya simultaneously.

They wear a white shirt of wide and long sleeves, a black vest adorned with red ribbons and black trousers. They also wear a crown of showy peacock's feathers. Their presence is important in all the big celebrations of the region.

Other well-known dances that are performed in diverse localities are:

 The "Conchiperla", in which the man gives a handkerchief to his partner keeping a knee in the ground and if he doesn't do it, a glass of liqueur must be drunk in punishment.
 The "Trapichillo", danced by four couples grabbed by the right hands and turning around from right to left side
 The "Quinsamana", in which insult compliments are mixed.

Carnaval in Amazonas
The "carnival music" that is played in of real euphoria. It is similar to the huayno. At its times, couples dance forming the pandilla (a kind of dance) around the humishas - trees adorned with quitasueños, small mirrors, ornamental chain stitches and pennants. These trees are filled with gifts, including live animals, which the guests take when these trees are knocked down at the end of the celebration.

The couple that makes the humisha fall down in a Mardi gras celebration has the commitment to make a new humisha from the following year onward.

See also
Culture of Peru

References

 
Peruvian culture